ISTAF World Cup, is an indoor international sepak takraw competition conducted by the International Sepaktakraw Federation (ISTAF), contested by men's and women's national teams. The first championships started in 2011 in Malaysian Kuala Lumpur and 23 male and 13 female teams took part in it. The competition takes place regularly every four years. In 2015, the next edition is scheduled, which was postponed due to the Southeast Asian Games. It was not until 2017 in Hyderabad (India) that the second edition took place. All the tournaments have been won by Thailand.

Summary

Men
Thailand men's national sepak takraw team has been the most dominating team in the world so far. All the two world cups has been won by Thailand so far.

Medal table

Women's
Thailand women's national sepak takraw team has been the most dominating team in the world so far. All the two world cups has been won by Thailand so far.

Medal table

References

External links
 ISTAF official website

 
World Cup
World championships